"El Problema" ("The Problem") is a Latin pop song written, produced and performed by Guatemalan Grammy Award winner singer-songwriter Ricardo Arjona. It was released as the lead single from his ninth studio album, Santo Pecado (2002). It is also recognized as one of Ricardo Arjona's signature songs.

Critically and commercially successful, the song became a hit by the singer, staying at No.1 for eight consecutive weeks at the Billboard Hot Latin Songs and twelve weeks at No.1 on the Latin Pop Songs chart, both being the most by any of his singles to date.

Reception 
On the success of the song, Arjona commented that "it is an accident that happens, and you doesn't now how it is about. I thought 'El Problema' wasn't a song that could sound on radio and it happened." Mario Tarradell from The Dallas Morning News commented that "filled with lengthy verses and a gospellike chorus, the cut hardly sounds like your usual drive-time fodder."

Music video 
The music video for "El Problema" was filmed between November 16 and 18, 2002 on Barcelona, Spain. The video features the singer chasing a woman throughout the city to finally find her at the La Sagrada Familia, Barcelona's biggest church, in which he is arrested by the police and sent to prison.

Track listing

Chart performance
"El Problema" became a huge commercial success for Arjona. The song debuted at No.27 on the Billboard Latin Songs chart the week ending November 2, 2002. The following week it jumped to No.11, receiving the "Greatest Gainer" honor for that week. On the week ending November 16, "El Problema" jumped to No.9, thus becoming Arjona's third song to reach the top 10, after "Desnuda" and "Cuando", both of which reached No.1 in 2000. The week ending December 7, 2002, "El Problema" reached No.1 on the chart, and stayed there for eight consecutive weeks. On the Latin Pop Songs chart, it debuted at No.17 on the week ending November 2, 2002, and reached No.1 on the week ending November 30. The song stayed at No.1 for nine consecutive weeks. It is, to date, the longest-running number-one single by the Guatemalan singer on both charts.

Weekly charts

Yearly charts

Decade-End charts

Release history

References 

2002 songs
Ricardo Arjona songs
Songs written by Ricardo Arjona